Lincolnshire County Council is the county council that governs the non-metropolitan county of Lincolnshire in England, less those parts governed by the unitary authorities of North Lincolnshire and North East Lincolnshire. The number of councillors was reduced from 77 to 70 at the 2017 local election.

The council was created in 1974 under the Local Government Act 1972.  It succeeded the Holland, Kesteven and Lindsey County Councils, and the Lincoln County Borough Council.

Responsibilities
The council is responsible for public services such as education, transport, highways, heritage, social care, libraries, trading standards, and waste management.

Premises
The council has its main offices and meeting place at County Offices on Newland in Lincoln. The building was built in 1926–1932 as the headquarters for the former Lindsey County Council, one of Lincolnshire County Council's predecessors.

Chief executives 
Chief executives have included:
 1973–1979: David Drury Macklin
 1983–1995: Robert John Dudley Proctor
 1995–1998: Jill Helen Barrow, who was the first woman chief executive of a county council in England.
 1999–2004: David Bowles
 2005-2018: Tony McArdle
 2018: Richard Wills (Interim Head of Paid Service) 
 2018: Keith Ireland 
 2018–present: Debbie Barnes

Borough, City, and District councils
The county council is the upper-tier of local government, below which are seven councils with responsibility for local services such as housing, planning applications, licensing, council tax collection and rubbish collection. The districts of Lincolnshire are:
Boston Borough
City of Lincoln
East Lindsey
North Kesteven
South Holland
South Kesteven
West Lindsey

References

 
County councils of England
1974 establishments in England
Local education authorities in England
Local authorities in Lincolnshire
Major precepting authorities in England
Leader and cabinet executives